White Rabbit is a 2018 American comedy-drama film directed by Daryl Wein and starring Vivian Bang.

Cast
Vivian Bang
Nana Ghana
Nico Evers-Swindell 
Tracy Hazas as Actress
Elizabeth Sung 
Michelle Sui

Reception
The film has  rating on Rotten Tomatoes based on 8 reviews.  Nick Allen of RogerEbert.com awarded the film three stars.

References

External links
 
 

American comedy-drama films
Comedy films about Asian Americans
Films about Korean Americans
2010s English-language films
2010s American films